Shire of Broadsound was a local government area in the Capricornia region of Queensland, Australia.

History

On 11 November 1879, the Broadsound Division was established as one of 74 divisions around Queensland under the Divisional Boards Act 1879 with a population of 1146.

On 3 March 1892, part of subdivision 2 of the Broadsound Division was transferred to subdivision 3 of the Gogango Division. Another part of subdivision 2 of the Broadsound Division was transferred to the Duaringa Division.

On 7 February 1883, part of subdivisions 2 and 3 of Broadsound Division were separated to create Nebo Division.

With the passage of the Local Authorities Act 1902, Broadsound Division became the Shire of Broadsound on 31 March 1903.

On 15 March 2008, under the Local Government (Reform Implementation) Act 2007 passed by the Parliament of Queensland on 10 August 2007, Broadsound merged with the Shires of Belyando and Nebo to form the Isaac Region.

Towns and localities
The Shire of Broadsound included the following settlements:

 St Lawrence
 Carmila
 Clairview
 Clarke Creek
 Dysart
 Flaggy Rock
 Greenhill
 Ilbilbie
 Middlemount
 Valkyrie

Population

Chairmen
 1907: J.C. Hutton  
 1909: Ramsden Gledstanes Talbot 
 1915: Ramsden Gledstanes Talbot 
 1927: James Gillespie

References

External links

 
 

Former local government areas of Queensland
2008 disestablishments in Australia
Populated places disestablished in 2008
1879 establishments in Australia